Edwin (Edward) Baker Dean (December 3, 1842 – December 12, 1917) was an American politician in the state of Washington. He served in the Washington House of Representatives from 1889 to 1891, representing Spokane as a member of the Republican party.

At seventeen, Dean was a founding member of the "Young Wide Awakes of Muscatine".
Like many Wide Awakes he was among the first to volunteer for the Union Army during the Civil War enlisting in the 1st Iowa Infantry
and later in the Iowa 18th
. In the 18th he rose to the rank of captain. Following the war he returned to Muscatine, Iowa where along with his father and brothers he worked as a mason.  During the 1870s he and his brother Hamilton relocated to Boulder, Colorado where they were known as the "Dean Brothers" and worked as bricklayers until their departure in 1883. Eventually they settled in the Spokane area.

Four years after his single term as a representative ended, Dean suffered the loss of his brother Hamilton and sister-in-law Lula when they were killed by a tree felled by a road crew. The tragedy was noted in newspapers across the country with Hamilton erroneously referred to as "Howard". By 1904 Dean had relocated to Sonoma County, California. For unknown reasons he stopped contacting family and friends from at least 1903 until shortly before his death at which time he was destitute.

References

1842 births
1917 deaths
Republican Party members of the Washington House of Representatives
People from Iroquois County, Illinois